Gavà is a municipality in the Baix Llobregat comarca, in the province of Barcelona in Catalonia, Spain. It borders the coast of the Mediterranean Sea between Viladecans and Castelldefels.

Gavà has a beach and two population centers: the city proper and Gavà Mar (Gavà Sea), a coastal neighborhood.

Gavà's mayor belongs to the Socialists' Party of Catalonia.

Education

Lycée Français de Gavà Bon Soleil, a French international school, is in the town.
British College of Gava, is in the town.

Demography

Sports 
 CF Gavà (football)

References

 Panareda Clopés, Josep Maria; Rios Calvet, Jaume; Rabella Vives, Josep Maria (1989). Guia de Catalunya, Barcelona: Caixa de Catalunya.  (Spanish).  (Catalan).

External links
 The Website of Gavà (in Catalan | Spanish | English)
 Artistic and historical buildings in Gavà (in Catalan)
 The Website of Gavà Mar (in Catalan | Spanish | English | French)
 Government data pages 

Municipalities in Baix Llobregat